Funü shibao (Chinese: 婦女時報; Women's News) was a Chinese monthly women's magazine that was published from 1911 to 1917 in Shanghai, China. It was the earliest commercial women's magazine in the country.

History and profile
Funü shibao was established by Di Baoxian in 1911. The first issue appeared on 6 November 1911. The magazine was published by Funü Shibao Division at You Zheng publishing company on a monthly basis. Bao Tianxiao served as the editor-in-chief of the monthly, which had its headquarters in Shanghai. 

Funü shibao featured articles written by women. Many revolutionary women wrote for the magazine, such as Zhang Mojun. The magazine covered articles about female liberation as well as fashion and hairstyles for women. It also contained work translated from Japanese. The number of female readers increased over time.

The magazine ceased publication in 1917.

References

1911 establishments in China
1917 disestablishments in China
Chinese-language magazines
Defunct magazines published in China
Magazines established in 1911
Magazines disestablished in 1917
Magazines published in Shanghai
Monthly magazines published in China
Women's magazines published in China